Belford is both a surname and a given name. Notable people with the name include:

Surname:
Cameron Belford (born 1988), English footballer 
Charles Belford (1837–1880), Irish Canadian journalist 
Dale Belford (born 1967), English footballer,
James B. Belford (1837–1910), American Politician
Joseph M. Belford (1852–1917), American Politician 
Ken Belford (born 1946), Canadian poet

Given name:
Belford Hendricks (1909–1977), aka Belford Cabell Hendricks & Belford Clifford Hendricks, American composer, pianist, arranger, conductor and record producer
Belford Lawson Jr. (1901–1985), American lawyer and activist
David Belford West (1896–1973), American football player
Ronald Belford Scott (1946-1980), Former singer of AC/DC